Megachile subnigra is a species of bee in the family Megachilidae. It was described by Cresson in 1879.

References

Subnigra
Insects described in 1879